Dantapuram a small village in Srikakulam district.  Known as Buddhas Tooth at Dantapura, the capital of the Kalingas.  While ancient Dantapuram sank into oblivion, Kandy receives tens of thousands of visitors every month. Historians believe it to be the capital of Kalinga Kingdom. Emperor Asoka fought Kalinga War in 261 BC.

The word danta in Telugu language means Tooth. Dantapura, the reputed capital of ancient Kalingas. There is similarity between Dantavuram and Dantapura of the Buddhist chronicles induces me to identify Dantavuram. This identification is also corroborated by the writings of the ancient Roman geographer, Pliny who mentions about the Calingoe in his Natural History.

References 
https://web.archive.org/web/20070928003605/http://www.tlca.com/adults/buddhist.html

Buddhist pilgrimage sites in India
Archaeological sites in Andhra Pradesh